The 2020 Toronto FC season was the 14th season in the history of Toronto FC. The club entered the season as defending MLS Eastern Conference champions.  They were scheduled to compete for the first time in the Leagues Cup, however it was cancelled due to the COVID-19 pandemic. They participated in the MLS is Back Tournament, which was the beginning of the resumed season following the postponement of regular season matches due to the pandemic.

On September 11, 2020, Connecticut governor Ned Lamont announced that Toronto FC would finish their season's home matches at Pratt & Whitney Stadium due to travel restrictions outside the United States due to the pandemic.

On October 11, Toronto FC became the first MLS team to clinch a playoff berth following a 1–0 win over FC Cincinnati.

Squad
As of October 14, 2020.

Roster slots 
Toronto had eight International roster slots and three Designated Player slots available for use in the 2020 season.

Transfers
Note: All figures in United States dollars.

In

Loaned in

Draft picks 

The following players were selected by Toronto FC in the 2020 SuperDraft held on January 9.

First round

Second round

Out

Transferred out

Loaned out

Pre-season
Toronto FC's pre-season officially began on January 18 when players and staff attended BMO Training Ground to undergo medical evaluations. Their first official training session of the season occurred on January 20 in Orlando, Florida as part of the team's preliminary training camp. The team resumed training camp on February 5 at the University of California, Irvine and played a series of friendly matches.

Matches

Competitions

Major League Soccer

League tables

Eastern Conference

Overall

Summary

Note: Table does not include three group matches of MLS is Back Tournament.(Pld 3, W 1, D 2, L 0, GF 6, GA 5, GD +1, Pts 5)

Results by round

Matches
The 2020 Major League Soccer schedule was originally released in full on December 19, 2019, 12:00 PM ET. However, the season was suspended on March 12 due to the COVID-19 pandemic, resulting in the cancellation of matches. The season resumed in July with the MLS is Back Tournament, where the three group stage matches counted as regular season games. Following the tournament, the regular season continued; however, due to travel restrictions between the United States and Canada, the league's three Canadian teams played their next six matches against each other in Canada, with these matches also serving as the qualification process for the 2020 Canadian Championship.

MLS Cup Playoffs

Canadian Championship

Qualification
As part of the MLS regular season, Canada's three Major League Soccer clubs played each other three times from August 18 to September 16. The team with the most points from this series, Toronto FC, qualified for the Canadian Championship.

Final
After being unable to be held in 2020, the match was initially postponed to early 2021 to occur at the beginning of the 2021 season. On March 11, 2021, it was announced that the match could not be completed in time for the start of CCL competition; a compromise was reached where Toronto FC would be named to the CCL slot, while Forge FC would be permitted to host the match once it was finally played. On March 25, 2021, Canada Soccer president Nick Bontis said that the final may end up taking place as late as July 2022. On March 2, 2022, it was announced that the final would take place on June 4, 2022 at Tim Hortons Field.

Leagues Cup

Toronto FC was set to compete for the first time in the Leagues Cup after not qualifying the CONCACAF Champions League and finishing in fourth place in the Eastern Conference during the 2019 regular season. They were to host a club from Liga MX in Mexico and entered the draw as the fifth seeded MLS team. The tournament was cancelled on May 19, 2020, due to the COVID-19 pandemic.

MLS is Back Tournament

Group stage

Group C

Knockout stage

Round of 16

Competitions summary
{| class="wikitable" style="text-align: center"
|-
!rowspan="2"|Competition
!colspan="8"|Record
!rowspan="2"|First Match
!rowspan="2"|Last Match
!rowspan="2"|Final Position
|-
!
!
!
!
!
!
!
!
|-
| MLS Regular Season

|February 9, 2020
|November 8, 2020
|2nd in Eastern Conference, 2nd Overall
|-
| MLS Cup Playoffs

|colspan="2"|November 24, 2020
|First round
|-
| Canadian Championship

|colspan="2"|TBD
|TBD
|-
| MLS is Back Knockout Stage

|colspan="2"|July 26, 2020
|Round of 16
|-
! Total

!colspan="4"|

Goals and assists 

{| class="wikitable sortable" style="font-size:100%; text-align:center"
|+Goals
!width=15|Rank
!width=15|Nation
!width=130|Name
!width=15|Pos.
!width=50|Major League Soccer
!width=50|MLS Cup Playoffs
!width=50|Canadian Championship
!width=50| Knockout Stage
!width=50|Total
|-
|rowspan="2"|1|||| Ayo Akinola || FW || 9 || 0 || 0 || 0 ||rowspan="2"|9
|-
||| Alejandro Pozuelo || MF || 9 || 0 || 0 || 0
|-
|rowspan="2"|3|||| Richie Laryea || DF || 4 || 0 || 0 || 0 ||rowspan="2"|4
|-
||| Pablo Piatti || FW || 4 || 0 || 0 || 0
|-
|rowspan="2"|5|||| Jozy Altidore || FW || 2 || 0 || 0 || 0 ||rowspan="2"|2
|-
||| Patrick Mullins || FW || 1 || 0 || 0 || 1
|-
|rowspan="4"|7|||| Ifunanyachi Achara || FW || 1 || 0 || 0 || 0 ||rowspan="4"|1
|-
||| Nick DeLeon || MF || 1 || 0 || 0 || 0
|-
||| Tsubasa Endoh || FW || 1 || 0 || 0 || 0
|-
||| Jonathan Osorio || MF || 1 || 0 || 0 || 0
|-
|colspan="4"|Own goals
| 0
| 0
| 0
| 0
| 0
|- class="sortbottom"
| colspan="4"|Totals||33|| 0||0||1||34 

{| class="wikitable sortable" style="font-size:100%; text-align:center"
|+Assists
!width=15|Rank
!width=15|Nation
!width=130|Name
!width=15|Pos.
!width=50|Major League Soccer
!width=50|MLS Cup Playoffs
!width=50|Canadian Championship
!width=50| Knockout Stage
!width=50|Total
|-
|1|||| Alejandro Pozuelo || MF || 10 || 0 || 0 || 0 ||10
|-
|rowspan="2"|2|||| Richie Laryea || DF || 4 || 0 || 0 || 0 ||rowspan="2"|4
|-
||| Pablo Piatti || FW || 4 || 0 || 0 || 0
|-
|4|||| Jonathan Osorio || MF || 3 || 0 || 0 || 0 ||3
|-
|rowspan="2"|5|||| Jozy Altidore || FW || 1 || 0 || 0 || 1 ||rowspan="2"|2
|-
||| Nick DeLeon || MF || 2 || 0 || 0 || 0
|-
|rowspan="6"|7|||| Auro Jr. || DF || 1 || 0 || 0 || 0 ||rowspan="6"|1
|-
||| Michael Bradley || MF || 1 || 0 || 0 || 0
|-
||| Marky Delgado || MF || 1 || 0 || 0 || 0
|-
||| Tony Gallacher || DF || 1 || 0 || 0 || 0
|-
||| Chris Mavinga || DF || 1 || 0 || 0 || 0
|-
||| Patrick Mullins || FW || 1 || 0 || 0 || 0
|-
|- class="sortbottom"
| colspan="4"|Totals||30||0||0||1||31

Shutouts 
{| class="wikitable sortable" style="font-size:100%; text-align:center"
!width=15|Rank
!width=15|Nation
!width=130|Name
!width=15|Pos.
!width=50|Major League Soccer
!width=50|MLS Cup Playoffs
!width=50|Canadian Championship
!width=50| Knockout Stage
!width=50|Total
|-
|1|||| Quentin Westberg || GK || 6 || 0 || 0 || 0 ||6
|-
|2|||| Alex Bono || GK || 3 || 0 || 0 || 0 ||3
|- class="sortbottom"
| colspan="4"|Totals||9||0||3||0||9

Honours

MLS Team of the Week

MLS Player of the Week

MLS Goal of the Week

MLS Player of the Month

End of Season awards

References

Notes

External links

Toronto FC seasons
Toronto FC
Toronto FC
Toronto FC
Toronto FC